Branislav "Ciga" Jerinić (20 March 1932 – 27 June 2006) was a Serbian actor. He appeared in more than ninety films from 1958 to 2003.

Selected filmography

References

External links 

1932 births
2006 deaths
Actors from Kragujevac
Serbian male film actors